Hanneke Ketelaars (born 17 April 1974) is a Dutch former professional tennis player.

Ketelaars grew up in Mariaheide and would practise at a local tennis park run by her parents.

Competing professionally in the 1990s, Ketelaars reached a best singles ranking of 186 and featured in the qualifying draw for the 1995 Australian Open. Her only WTA Tour main draw appearance came as a doubles player at the 1993 Virginia Slims of Florida and she won two $25,000 ITF doubles titles during her career.

Following her retirement from the tour in 1996 she continued to play in amateur competitions, winning two Indoor and two Outdoor national championships.

ITF finals

Singles: 2 (0–2)

Doubles: 4 (2–2)

References

External links
 
 

1974 births
Living people
Dutch female tennis players
People from Veghel
20th-century Dutch women
21st-century Dutch women
Sportspeople from North Brabant